Beema Nagar is an area of the city of Tiruchirapalli in the Indian state of Tamil Nadu. The district court and district registrar office are located within the neighborhood.

References 
 

Neighbourhoods and suburbs of Tiruchirappalli